Erik Boye (born 7 February 1964) is a Danish former professional footballer who played as a goalkeeper.

He started his career with FC Fredericia before transferring to Vejle in 1993. In the 1996–97 Danish Superliga he was ever present as his club finished in 2nd place and qualified for the 1997–98 UEFA Cup. He played well over 200 games for Vejle

After his time at Vejle he moved to AGF Aarhus, and he played for them for another three seasons.

As of July 2012 he was the goalkeeping coach at Vejle.

In May 2013 he was appointed as goalkeeping coach at Randers FC.

References

1964 births
Living people
Danish men's footballers
Association football goalkeepers
Danish Superliga players
Vejle Boldklub players
Aarhus Gymnastikforening players
Association football goalkeeping coaches